At least two ships of the French Navy have been named Fougueux:

 , a  launched in 1785 and wrecked in 1805
 , a  launched in 1928 and sunk in 1942

French Navy ship names